AJ Harris may refer to:

Andrew Harris (cricketer, born 1973), English cricketer, commonly known as A. J. Harris
A. J. Harris (born 1984), Canadian football running back
AJ Harris (cornerback), American football defensive back